Suzuka is a Japanese manga series written and illustrated by Kouji Seo and published by Kodansha. Suzuka originally debuted in Weekly Shōnen Magazine in serialized form in issue #12, 2004 and in tankōbon form on May 17, 2004. There are 18 volumes (note two versions of volume 11 were printed: a regular issue, and a limited edition special printing), and two special edition guide books. The series concluded with volume 18.

Chapter list

Guide Books

Suzuka Official Guide Book

 Publication issue date: September 16, 2005 (first printing)
 Cover: Suzuka
Special edition reference book for the Suzuka manga series covering volumes 1 through 8.

Includes profiles for all characters, including secondary characters (such as the recurring door-to-door sales girl (she's never named), the street jewelry vendor "Bobby", etc.).

The main characters are explored in detail: Their motivation, secret thoughts, dreams, etc. Each main character is interviewed using the 50 question technique: "What is your favorite school subject", "Your least favorite", "Two of your friends are fighting, what will you do", and so on. Although the first dozen or so questions are meaningless, the rest are quite revealing, and reading the different characters' answers to the same question set shows their personalities.

The inconsistencies in the series are explored. Contradictions such as the how the apartment building is different from the outside versus the inside: Every drawing of the outside shows each apartment consists of two windows – a small window next to a large one on a veranda; yet, all internal drawings depict a single room with the large veranda window. Where did the small window go? The inconsistencies are never explained. The author merely acknowledges them, hinting that it's an inside joke.

There is a 19-page story called "Honoka" which explains how she decides to become the field and track team manager.

 
 

And finally, the author, Seo Kouji [Seo is the family name, Kouji is his first name], is
interviewed. His philosophy and intentions for the Suzuka series are explained. Since
all places depicted in his story are places he has been in, color photos from those areas
are included along with the drawings from the manga.

Suzuka Official Guide Book - Graduation Edition
 Cover: Suzuka and Yamato, back to back in their high school uniforms
 (Japanese )
 Announced Publication issue date: October 17, 2007 (First printing)

Light novel
 Japanese title: 

 Publication issue date: May 17, 2007 (First printing)
A 223-page light novel, written in Japanese, featuring three short stories authored by Ayuna Fujisaki. Cover art and 12 full page illustrations by Kouji Seo. No official English translated version.
Cover: Suzuka in a summer dress
 Story 1:  A new character, created for this story.
 Story 2: 
 Story 3:

References

Chapters
Lists of manga volumes and chapters